The Manchester Youth Theatre was a youth theatre which operated in Manchester from 1966 until 2003. It was founded by Geoff Sykes, a lifelong friend of Michael Croft founder of The National Youth Theatre who served as its Artistic Director until his death. Sykes and his wife Hazel ran Manchester Youth Theatre staging plays, musicals and devised shows which featured at the local theatres in Manchester.

Mike Leigh, then a lecturer at the Catholic women teachers training college Sedgley Park, devised and directed two big-cast projects for the Manchester Youth Theatre: Big Basil and Glum Victoria and the Lad with Specs .

Sam Boardman-Jacobs won acclaim for his work on Holocaust and Yiddish drama with the Manchester Youth Theatre.

Alumni
The notable alumni include Dominic Monaghan; Aiden Shaw; Steven Pinder; Kevin Kennedy; David Threlfall; Lee Oakes; David Bamber; Lesley Sharpl Phil Rose; Gillian Bevan;  Alan Williams; Karl Heaver; Shaun Gorringe; Bernard Latham

References

Coveney, Michael The Aisle is Full of Noises (Nick Hern Books, 1994)

Youth theatre companies
Organisations based in Manchester
Culture in Manchester